Darling Range Sports College is an Independent Public secondary school in Forrestfield, a suburb  east of Perth, Western Australia. Formerly known as Forrestfield Senior High School, the school was renamed in 2008 due to it becoming a specialist sports school.

History
The school opened in 1975 as Forrestfield Senior High School.

In 2000, $300,000 was spent on making the school's pool indoors and heated.

In 2001, Bianca Batten, a student at Forrestfield Senior High School, won the Beazley Medal for Vocational Education and Training (VET). This was the first time the Beazley Medal for VET had been awarded, having previously been awarded to just the top TEE student. The Beazley Medal is the most prestigious award offered to year 12 graduates in Western Australia.

In 2008, the school was turned into a specialist sports school. Prior to that, the school had several sports programs, but more became available in 2008. Alongside this, the school was rebranded as Darling Range Sports College, named after the nearby Darling Range.

In 2011, a $4 million, 250 seat indoor sports stadium was opened. In late 2014, $2.6 million worth of new buildings were completed to increase the capacity of the school for the addition of year 7 students in 2015. The upgrades included 5 new classrooms.

At the start of 2019, designs were revealed for a $10 million upgrade. In December 2019, the upgrades commenced. The upgrades were a 2017 election commitment by the Labor Party, and include new buildings for design and technology and food technology, as well as the refurbishment of existing science laboratories. The new buildings were completed late 2020.

Programs

Sports academy
Darling Range Sports College is the first specialist sports school in Western Australia. It provides school based specialist programs in athletics, Australian rules football, baseball, basketball, netball, rugby league, soccer, swimming, and triathlon. Sports facilities include a 250-seat indoor stadium and an eight-lane, 25 metre indoor swimming pool. Among the coaches of the specialist programs are Sandover Medallist Aaron Black and former Perth Wildcats and Cairns Taipans coach Alan Black.

Other
Non sports programs offered by the school include the Academic Challenge and Enrichment program, music program, and Vocational Education and Training program.

Student numbers

Notable alumni
 Jessica Anstiss – Netball player for the West Coast Fever.
 Denver Grainger-Barras – AFL footballer for the Hawthorn Football Club.

See also

 List of schools in the Perth metropolitan area

References

Public high schools in Perth, Western Australia
Educational institutions established in 1975
1975 establishments in Australia
Sports schools in Australia
Forrestfield, Western Australia